The Mbankomo Centre of Excellence (French: Centre d'Excellence de Mbankomo) is sports training facility owned by the Confederation of African Football (CAF) in Mbankomo, Cameroon which has been operational since 1998. It is situated in the middle of the equatorial forest which gives teams a secluded place for training. The centre also serves as the home venue of the Cameroon national football team.

History

Development
It was during one of Assisi's Executive Committee meeting in South Africa in April 2003 that the CAF had decided to contribute more to the development of football on the continent through the construction of sports facilities. In its first phase achievements, six regions of Africa had been identified. For the zone in Central Africa, the country of Roger Milla was chosen. The Government of the Republic of Cameroon has offered Mbankomo field, located 24 km from Yaoundé. December 20, 2006, Shorouk, an Egyptian company started work, which in principle should be received in the month of July.

Costs 
Six (6) billion CFA francs. In the opinion of Issa Hayatou, the chairman of the Confederation of African Football (CAF), it is approximately the amount of money already engulfed by his institution in the works construction of the "Centre of Excellence" in Cameroon. The announcement was made last Friday during a site visit by the President of CAF, who was accompanied on the occasion by his employees.
In the opinion of Issa Hayatou, the contribution of the International Federation of Association Football (FIFA) is $1.8 million (1.2 in interest-free repayable loan and $600 million in donations). The rest of the investment capital comes from the CAF. He added that the Centre of Excellence Mbankomo could be more expensive: "If the government of Cameroon did not exempt the construction material of all customs duties."

Tenants 
Some teams have already used the centre's infrastructure:

 Burkina Faso national football team
 Cameroon national football team

Facilities
Already built over five hectares, 24 hectares were granted by the State of Cameroon, the Academy is located near the centre of Mbankomo, four kilometers from the road Yaounde- Douala. The architectural masterpiece includes a large central building, which has 40 luxury rooms, a restaurant, a conference room and several offices. Two playgrounds for the practice of football are being finalized. A maximum size (90mx120m) field will be covered with synthetic turf and other minimum size (45mx90) will be natural grass.

The centre has the following facilities:

 02 football playgrounds fields with artificial grass
 01 playing field with natural grass
 01 multi playground for volleyball, basketball and handball
 01 tennis field
 01 semi-olympic pool
 35 double rooms
 05 single rooms
 02 gyms equipped with fitness equipment of high technology
 01 sauna room
 01 steam
 01 Jacuzzi
 01 conference room with 110 seats and full sound system with a translation booth
 04 rooms with sound 30 seats each for the technical preparation of workshops and seminars players
 01 restaurant of 104 seats
 01 bar with terrace
 01 hall giving access to the many facilities of the centre
 02 villas
 01 Administration Building
 01 oxygenation area, which links 24 hectares of land available that are about to be built for walking
 02 parking spaces for 250 vehicles are constructed
 09 tanks with a capacity of 12,000 liters for drinkable/clean water supply
 03 generators for electricity supply

Only 6 hectares of the 24 hectares available are occupied.

Operations 
The centre which has been operational since 2010, is located in the quiet equatorial forest, in a secure, ideal for training, green housing and seminars environment

References

External links 
 {fr}YAOUNDE – 21 MAI 2008 © Emile Zola Ndé Tchoussi | Mutations
 {fr}
 {fr}
 {fr}16392.html

Football in Cameroon
Association football training grounds in Cameroon